Helmuth Koinigg (3 November 1948 – 6 October 1974) was an Austrian racing driver who died in a crash in the 1974 United States Grand Prix, in his second Grand Prix start.

Racing career
Koinigg was born in Vienna. Like several other Formula One drivers, Koinigg's first racing car was a Mini Cooper, which he had purchased from Niki Lauda. He raced in touring cars, Formula Vee and Formula Ford before a period in sports car racing.  He subsequently found the finance to buy a seat with Scuderia Finotto driving their Brabham at his home Grand Prix in 1974, and although he failed to qualify, this led to a contract with Surtees for the last two races of the season.

After a good showing at the 1974 Canadian Grand Prix, Koinigg was beginning to establish himself as a good prospect for 1975. But running near the back in the US Grand Prix at Watkins Glen, Koinigg's car suffered a suspension failure at turn 7, pitching it head-on into the Armco barrier.  The speed at which Koinigg crashed was relatively low, and he ought to have escaped the accident uninjured.  However, as with a number of other circuits at that time, the Armco was insecurely installed and the bottom portion of it buckled as the vehicle struck it. The car passed underneath the top portion, which remained intact, decapitating Koinigg and killing him instantly. Koinigg's accident was reminiscent of the death of Formula One driver François Cevert at the same track the previous year, and Romain Grosjean's non-fatal crash at the 2020 Bahrain Grand Prix.

Complete Formula One results
(key)

24 Hours of Le Mans results

References

External links
Koinigg's profile at www.grandprix.com

1948 births
1974 deaths
Sportspeople from Vienna
Austrian racing drivers
Austrian Formula One drivers
Deaths by decapitation
Racing drivers who died while racing
Sports deaths in New York (state)
24 Hours of Le Mans drivers
Formula Super Vee Champions
Silvio Moser Racing Team Formula One drivers
Surtees Formula One drivers
World Sportscar Championship drivers

Formel Super Vau drivers
Porsche Motorsports drivers